Tobias Sjökvist (born August 18, 1995) is a Swedish ice hockey player. He is currently playing with Lindlövens IF of the Hockeyettan. His father Niklas Sjökvist was also a proplayer.

Career
He made his debut for BIK Karlskoga in the HockeyAllsvenskan were he played in the 2013-14 season 4 games. Sjökvist played one game in the Swedish Hockey League with Färjestad BK during the 2014–15 SHL season. He was also in the 2014-15 season on loan to Mariestad BoIS were he played 2 games in the HockeyEttan. In the season 2015-16 he played 33 games in the HockeyEttan for Örnsköldsvik HF. The following seasons he played for a bunch of clubs in the HockeyEttan: Köping HC, Borlänge HF, Tranås AIF and most recently for Linden Hockey.

Career statistics

Regular season and playoffs

References

External links

1995 births
Living people
Färjestad BK players
Swedish ice hockey forwards
People from Karlskoga Municipality
Sportspeople from Örebro County